Stuart Schuffman (born December 16, 1980, in Los Angeles, California), popularly known as Broke-Ass Stuart, is an American travel writer and blogger known for his guide book Broke-Ass Stuart’s Guide to Living Cheaply in San Francisco, of which he released two versions in zine form and one in book form. His travel documentary television series Young, Broke & Beautiful debuted in June 2011 on IFC.

His zines won "Best Local Zine" in the San Francisco Bay Guardians yearly "Best of the Bay" issue. He has been described as an "SF cult hero"  and “the pimp daddy of budget travel". He contributed to Lonely Planet's books Western Europe and Europe on a Shoestring for which he did the Ireland chapters. Schuffman's travel writings are mostly in first-person narrative form, with stories and information. In 2008, he released Broke-Ass Stuart’s Guide to Living Cheaply in New York City. His adage, seen on his websites and all of his merchandise, is “You are Young, Broke and Beautiful.”

Schuffman is the "Editor in Cheap" for a popular arts, culture, and events website for San Francisco and New York  He is also a food, drink, and night life culture contributor to the San Francisco Bay Guardian.

In 2014 Schuffman began the Kind of Late Show with Broke-Ass Stuart, a late night variety show with a "distinctly San Francisco Flavor." The show is recorded live at Doc's Lab in San Francisco and is broadcast as a web series on YouTube. The same year, Schuffman also released a new zine, "Love Notes and Other Disasters."

Schuffman was a candidate for Mayor of San Francisco in the 2015 election, according to the official candidates list.

Biography 
Stuart Schuffman was born into a secular Jewish family in Los Angeles. At the age of two he moved to El Paso and then moved to San Diego at age seven. He has one younger brother. He went to University City High School. In 2003 he graduated from University of California Santa Cruz with a Bachelors in American Studies. He then moved to San Francisco and worked in various establishments including but not limited to bars, the public library, a hat store, restaurants, a candy store, a jewelry store and an ice cream shop.

Literary career 
Schuffman's explanation for going into travel writing in his own words from the introduction of his books:

"I was working in a candy store in San Francisco when all this madness started. One day, an older kid from my neighborhood in San Diego came into the store with his fiancée (they’re married now). It had been years since I’d seen him, so it was really nice to hear what was going on in his life. After we chatted for a bit, and they bought some candy (I slang candy like a motherfucker), the fiancée handed me her card and told me that I should give them a shout next time I was in San Diego. After they left, I looked at her card. It said she was a travel writer. I thought to myself, 'Travel writer? I wanna be a travel writer,' and it was then that I decided to be one."

Upon graduation from UCSC, he moved to San Francisco, compiled his knowledge on living a frugal lifestyle in the city and wrote the first edition of Broke-Ass Stuart’s Guide to Living Cheaply in San Francisco. The end product was a 33-page black and white zine printed on regular computer paper which he first made copies of at Kinko's and later published at Pip Printing. The first fifty copies of the book quickly sold out, as did the next 100. The first edition sold around 1,000 copies and garnered him the "Best Local Zine" award in the SF Bay Guardian'''s Best of the Bay issue.

"Broke-Ass Stuart’s Guide to Living Cheaply in San Francisco v.2," still in the zine format, came out in July 2005 and sold 300 copies in the first week. Final sales estimates range around 3000. V.2 also came with more publicity. There was a book release party held at The Balazo Gallery (now called Submission), various television and radio appearances as well as web interviews.

In 2006 Schuffman contributed to the Lonely Planet books Western Europe and Europe on a Shoestring. He traveled through Ireland for two months and composed narratives and tips geared towards the young and thrifty travelers of Europe.

In November 2007, the third version of Broke-Ass Stuart’s Guide to Living Cheaply in San Francisco was released, this time with Falls Media publishing company. With the assistance of the publishing company, Schuffman was able to promote his book to a wider audience with increased internet presence, more television and radio appearances, and another book release party which was attended by over 700 people.

December 7, 2008, marked the release of Broke-ass Stuart’s Guide to Living Cheaply in New York City. The release party for the book (also published by Falls Media) was held at the Delancey Bar and Night Club in the Lower East Side of Manhattan.

In 2014, Schuffman released a 60-page zine entitled "Love Notes and Other Disasters," which compiled some of his more well known pieces such as "Living in SF Means," "Why You Should Fuck a Writer," and other unreleased prose and poetry.

TV and Other Live Performances

On June 24, 2011, the travel documentary television series Young Broke & Beautiful, created and hosted by Schuffman, debuted on IFC.  The show was intended to explore lesser-known and "alternative" travel experiences; the opening series included visits to New Orleans, Baltimore, Detroit, Memphis, Boston, and San Diego.Allison Good, "'Young, Broke & Beautiful' visits New Orleans", The Times-Picayune, July 15, 2011. Critical response included negative comments from Chris Barton of the Los Angeles Times, who called Schuffman "a tireless self-promoter" with "tastes [that] aren't as edgy as he thinks, and Boston Globe critic Matthew Gilbert, who felt the show was "straining too hard to be different".

 References 

 Further reading Broke-ass Stuart’s Guide to Living Cheaply in San Francisco. Falls Media, New York NY, 2007.Broke-ass Stuart’s Guide to Living Cheaply in New York City. Falls Media, New York, NY, 2008.Europe On a Shoe String: big trips on small budgets. Lonely Planet, Footscray, Australia.Western Europe''. Lonely Planet, Footscray, Australia.

External links 

1980 births
Living people
Writers from Los Angeles
Writers from San Diego
Writers from San Francisco
American travel writers
American male non-fiction writers